Viktoriya Anatoliïvna Pavlysh (born 15 January 1969 in Kharkov, Ukrainian SSR, Soviet Union) is a former track and field athlete who specialized in the shot put.

Pavlysh was stripped of her 1999 IAAF World Indoor Championships gold medal after she had tested positive for anabolic steroid stanozolol at the event in Maebashi, Japan. She claimed that she may have taken the drug to aid her recovery from injury. For this offence she received a two-year ban.

Five years later at the 2004 IAAF World Indoor Championships in Budapest, Hungary she won the title again only to fail the drug test for the same reason. She was again stripped of her title and banned from athletics for life.

Whether because of her drug-use or not, Pavlysh was famed for her very muscular lower body. During a state television show her middle-thigh was measured at 98 cm and her calf at 65 cm.

See also
List of sportspeople sanctioned for doping offences

References

External links

World Championships
IAAF lifetime ban

1969 births
Living people
Sportspeople from Kharkiv
Doping cases in athletics
Ukrainian sportspeople in doping cases
Soviet female shot putters
Ukrainian female shot putters
Athletes (track and field) at the 1992 Summer Olympics
Athletes (track and field) at the 1996 Summer Olympics
Olympic athletes of Ukraine
Olympic athletes of the Unified Team
World Athletics Championships medalists
European Athletics Championships medalists
World Athletics Indoor Championships winners